Martin Colin Snedden  (born 23 November 1958) is a former New Zealand cricketer, who played 25 cricket tests, and 93 One Day Internationals, between 1980 and 1990. He was a member of New Zealand's seam bowling attack, alongside Richard Hadlee and Ewen Chatfield, throughout its golden age in the 1980s.

Family
Snedden was born in 1958 in Auckland. His uncle, Colin Snedden, played one Test for New Zealand; his father, Warwick Snedden, and grandfather, Nessie Snedden, both also played first-class cricket. His brother, Patrick Snedden, is a company director and philanthropist. His son, Michael, made his first-class cricket debut for Wellington in October 2019, and became the first fourth-generation cricketer to play first-class cricket in New Zealand.

International career
Snedden's best Test figures were 5 for 68 in New Zealand's victory over West Indies in Christchurch in 1986-87. He was the first bowler to concede 100 runs in a One Day International with figures of 12–1–105–2 from a 60-over match; it remained the record for most runs conceded until surpassed by Mick Lewis in March 2006. Snedden was usually a lower-order batsman though he once scored 64 opening the innings in a One Day International. He also represented Auckland in New Zealand provincial cricket.

During 1980–81 Australia Tri-Nation Series, Snedden was believed to have made a fair catch by the TV replay footage at the boundary ropes. However, the on-field umpires ruled that Greg Chappel was not out and he went on to score 90 runs.

Beyond cricket

Snedden, a lawyer by profession, was for some years the Chief Executive Officer of New Zealand Cricket. He left NZC to head the 2011 Rugby World Cup Organising Team. Snedden was made a Companion of the New Zealand Order of Merit in the 2012 New Year Honours, for services to sporting administration.

References

External links
 
A news article relating to Snedden
 

1958 births
Living people
Auckland cricketers
Companions of the New Zealand Order of Merit
New Zealand cricket administrators
Cricketers at the 1983 Cricket World Cup
Cricketers at the 1987 Cricket World Cup
New Zealand One Day International cricketers
New Zealand Test cricketers
New Zealand cricketers
20th-century New Zealand lawyers
People educated at Rosmini College
North Island cricketers
Martin